The Council of Ministers is the executive branch of the government of Iraq.

The Council of Representatives of Iraq elects a President of the Republic who appoints the Prime Minister who in turn appoints the Council of Ministers, all of whom must be approved by the Assembly.

Members

See also
List of cabinets
Politics of Iraq
Political minister
Iraq

References

External links
  

Politics of Iraq
Government of Iraq
Iraq